Sulfur is an EP by Dutch experimental music group Gnaw Their Tongues, independently released on February 20, 2013. The music centers around the theme of World War I  and the album artwork is a photograph depicting three Canadian soldiers wounded by mustard gas (otherwise known as sulfur mustard).

Track listing

Personnel
Adapted from the Sulfur liner notes.
 Maurice de Jong (as Mories) – vocals, instruments, recording, cover art

Release history

References

External links 
 
 Sulfur at Bandcamp

2013 EPs
Gnaw Their Tongues albums